Pheidole rhea is a species of ant and a higher myrmicine in the family Formicidae.

References

Further reading

External links

 

rhea
Articles created by Qbugbot
Insects described in 1908